Wang Ting may refer to:

 Wang Ting (athlete), Paralympian athlete from China
 Wang Ting (volleyball) (born 1984), volleyball player from China